Lupinus shockleyi is a species of lupine known by the common name purple desert lupine. It is native to the Mojave and Sonoran Deserts, where it grows in open desert habitat. It is an annual herb growing up to 30 centimeters tall. Each palmate leaf is made up of 8 to 10 leaflets measuring 1 to 3 centimeters in length. The inflorescence is a small spiral of flowers. Each flower is about half a centimeter long and deep purple-blue in color with a yellowish patch on its banner. The fruit is an oval legume pod coated in thick, inflated hairs.

External links
Jepson Manual Treatment
Photo gallery

shockleyi
Flora of the Southwestern United States
Flora of the Sonoran Deserts